Carson Brown Strong (born September 14, 1999) is an American football quarterback for the Michigan Panthers of the United States Football League (USFL). He played college football at Nevada.

Early years
Strong was born on September 14, 1999, in Vacaville, California. He later attended Will C. Wood High School, where he passed for 2,732 yards and 26 touchdowns as a junior. He did not play his senior season due to a knee injury. In June 2017, Strong announced his commitment to play college football at the University of Nevada, Reno. Nevada was Strong's only FBS offer despite being a three-star recruit.

College career
Strong made his debut at Nevada against Portland State in August 2018,  where he rushed for 4 yards in the 72–19 win. He would go on to redshirt his first year at Nevada. Strong was named the starting quarterback for the 2019 season. In 10 starts, he completed 237 of 374 passes for 2,335 yards with 11 touchdowns and seven interceptions. 

He returned as a starter in 2020. Despite a shortened season due to the COVID-19 pandemic, Strong and the Wolf Pack would finish with a 7–2 record and win against Tulane in the 2020 Famous Idaho Potato Bowl. With 9 starts, Strong completed 249 of 355 passes for 2,858 passing yards, 27 touchdowns and 4 interceptions and he won the Mountain West Conference Offensive Player of the Year award in 2020. 

In 2021, Strong led the Wolf Pack to an 8–4 record in his best season at Nevada. Strong completed 366 of 522 passes for 4,175 passing yards, 36 touchdowns and 8 interceptions as Strong would win the Mountain West Conference Offensive Player of the Year award again and becoming the fifth player in conference history to win the award in back-to-back years. On December 14, 2021, Strong announced his intention to opt-out of the 2021 Quick Lane Bowl and to declare for the 2022 NFL Draft.

College statistics

Professional career

Philadelphia Eagles
On April 30, 2022, Strong signed an undrafted free-agent deal with the Philadelphia Eagles. It included a $20,000 signing bonus and $300,000 base guarantee. He was released on August 30.

Arizona Cardinals
On December 13, 2022, Strong was signed to the Arizona Cardinals' practice squad. He was released one week later.

Michigan Panthers 
On March 19, 2023, Strong signed with the Michigan Panthers of the United States Football League (USFL).

References

External links
 
 Philadelphia Eagles bio
 Nevada Wolf Pack profile

1999 births
Living people
People from Vacaville, California
Players of American football from California
Sportspeople from the San Francisco Bay Area
American football quarterbacks
Nevada Wolf Pack football players
Philadelphia Eagles players
Arizona Cardinals players
Michigan Panthers (2022) players